Oberea depressa is a species of beetle in the family Cerambycidae. It was described by Gebler in 1825. It is known from China, Russia and Mongolia.

References

depressa
Beetles described in 1825